St. Vincent's High and Technical School (known as SVTS) is one of the oldest schools in eastern India. It is a kindergarten through 12th grade school of secondary education, in Asansol, India, in the western part of West Bengal, about 200 km from Kolkata.

History 
Adjacent to St. Patrick's Higher Secondary School, the enormous 390 bihgas, property (grassy, semi-cultivated land) had been initially purchased by Br A Ryan, the Provincial of the Brothers who intended to work on the project of relocating the Moorghihatta Orphanage. The job of supervising the erection of buildings was given to Br. Joseph Moyes. Dr. Meulman S.J., Archbishop of Calcutta, on 25 October 1919, laid down the foundation stone but it was only 10 years later in 1929 that its first batch of 29 students came, soon followed by 20 more . St. Vincent's was a boarding school, reputed for its sportsmen, till the early nineties. Currently it is a day school with strength of about 1850 students. The senior secondary welcomed girl students from the year 2009. Apart from the Industrial Training Centre, St. Vincent's also runs an NIOS (Class X & XII) Centre for over 1500 students.

In 1895 the high school was sponsored by the Congregation of Christian Brothers, a Catholic society from Ireland that has undertaken missionary and education work worldwide. This group, informally known as the Christian Brothers, was founded by Sir Edmund Ignatius Rice. St. Vincent's High and Technical School is one of the 19 Christian Brothers schools in India. The foundation stone of St. Vincent's School was laid by Dr. Meulman S.J., Archbishop of Calcutta, on 25 October 1919.

In 1914, when the Calcutta Improvement Trust was formed for opening up the congested parts of the city. One of the roads, 100 feet wide, was designed to run through Chowringee Road to the cathedral in Moorghihatta, where it was to run through the Catholic male orphanage. This would leave CMO without a playground and kitchen. On a visit to St Patrick's Asansol, Br. Arsenius Ryan, the provincial of the Brothers, inspected an open partly cultivated plot of 50 bighas as a possible site for the orphanage. The site was purchased and, with the addition of surrounding plots, it increased to 390 bighas, the property on which St. Vincent's now stands. Br Joseph Moyes was selected to superintend the erection of the buildings.

In 1927 Br. Gabriel Pakenham was appointed superior and the first batch of 29 boys took up residence. They were soon joined by 20 more. Official government sanction came at the end of the year. Government stipulations were exacting so in 1928 it was decided to present students for the matriculation of Calcutta University.

Br. Baptist Collins who succeeded Br. Packenham used part of the extensive property for dairy farming. The herd of St Vincent's became the admiration of the district. Br. Aidan Callaghan followed Br. Collins in 1934. Affiliation to the University of Calcutta was made permanent in 1937. In 1938 arrangements were made for boys to sit for the Board of Apprenticeship Training examination. 
 
In 1939 the war intervened. In 1942 the British military took over the school and 350 RAF men occupied the buildings except the Chapel. Many of the boys went to St. Michael's Kurji and were dealt with there as a unit by the education department under the title of "St Vincent's School, Asansol, now at Kurji".

In February 1946 Br. Adjutor O'Connor returned as superior to take back the property from the military. On 1 March 1947 the school reopened. Rs. 21,117 was received from the military as rental and compensation for damage to buildings and grounds.

In 1949 it became a technical school. Through the efforts of Br. J.E. McCann a building was constructed and equipped for technical instruction. The provincial of the Christian Brothers in Australia offered the services of a qualified instructor: Br Raphael Maher. The boys of St. Vincent's were presented for the senior Cambridge examination with Metalwork, Woodwork and Technical Drawing along with Sciences, Mathematics, English and Literature.

At the end of his term Br. Maher returned to Australia in early 1955. Br. C.J. Harrison came from Australia to take charge of the technical school. He was joined by Br. R.C. Whiting and Br. R.A. Parton, also from Australia.

The foundation stone of St. Vincent's School was laid by Dr. Meulman, S.J., Archbishop of Calcutta, on 25 October 1919.

List of Principals 

Source; http://stvincentsschoolasansol.in/pages/pastprincipal.html

Description

With three sections for each class/grade from 1-10, three kindergarten sections KG-A, KG-B and KG-C, and two sections for 11-12 (11-A/11-B and 12-A/12-B), there are about 1,500 students enrolled. The school follows the 10+2 Council for the Indian School Certificate Examinations curriculum which includes the national ICSE exam at the end of Class 10 and the ISC exam at the end of Class 12.

St. Vincent's was originally fully residential. It started admitting day scholars later and closed the hostel in 1994. The school is one of the largest landowners in Asansol, with buildings, fields, a pond, buildings for the technical department, former residencies, a school for mentally and physically challenged children, "Asha Niketan", and acres of virgin wooded areas bordering the residential colony, Hill View, an old age home, etc. on prime real estate. It has a swimming pool, the only such institution with one. It runs summer swimming camps during summer vacations, open to children from all schools.

Activities

The school has four houses — St. Matthew's (blue), St. Mark's (red), St. Luke's (green) and St. John's (yellow). A sports day is held every two years when neighboring schools are invited to participate.

Rivals St. Patrick's, Loreto Convent and Assembly of God Church are invited to these activities. Science exhibitions, elocution, drama enactment, fete, quiz, concert and debate competitions are events in the annual calendar.

See also
Education in India
List of schools in India
Education in West Bengal

References

External links
St. Vincent's Asansol Alumni Association

Congregation of Christian Brothers secondary schools
Catholic schools in India
Christian schools in West Bengal
Primary schools in West Bengal
High schools and secondary schools in West Bengal
Schools in Paschim Bardhaman district
Education in Asansol
Educational institutions established in 1895
1895 establishments in India